Igor Yuriyevich Nikulin (14 August 1960 – 7 November 2021) was a hammer thrower who represented the USSR, the Unified Team, and later Russia. He won the bronze medal at the 1992 Olympic Games in Barcelona, Spain.

Nikulin's U23 world record of 83.54 m, set 2 September 1982 in Athens, put him 2nd in the world of all time behind Sergey Litvinov's 83.98 m. His personal best of 84.48 m was set on 12 July 1990 in Lausanne currently putting him 7th of all time. His father Yuriy Nikulin finished fourth at the men's hammer throw at the 1964 Summer Olympics. 

Nikulin died on 7 November 2021, at the age of 61.

International competitions

References

1960 births
2021 deaths
Athletes from Moscow
Russian male hammer throwers
Soviet male hammer throwers
Olympic male hammer throwers
Olympic athletes of the Unified Team
Olympic bronze medalists for the Unified Team
Olympic bronze medalists in athletics (track and field)
Athletes (track and field) at the 1992 Summer Olympics
Medalists at the 1992 Summer Olympics
Universiade medalists in athletics (track and field)
Universiade bronze medalists for the Soviet Union
Goodwill Games medalists in athletics
Competitors at the 1986 Goodwill Games
Competitors at the 1990 Goodwill Games
World Athletics Championships athletes for the Soviet Union
European Athletics Championships medalists
CIS Athletics Championships winners
Russian Athletics Championships winners
Friendship Games medalists in athletics